Walthamstow Urban District Council Light Railways operated a tramway service in Walthamstow between 1905 and 1933.

History

The Walthamstow and District Light Railway Order of 1903 authorised Walthamstow Urban District Council to start electric tramway services on 3 June 1905. The "and district" referred to the lines beyond the Walthamstow boundary into Chingford, where the terminus was just short of the "Prince Albert" pub, and Leyton, where the line ended at the "Bakers' Arms" PH.

The tramways became immortalised in January 1909, in national newspapers. The incident was known as the Walthamstow Tram Chase or Tottenham Outrage.  Two Latvian revolutionaries attacked a clerk in Tottenham and stole a large amount of money. Pursued by the police and the public there was shooting and some people were killed. The thieves commandeered a tram towards Highams Park. Both men eventually killed themselves and the money was never found. The incident later became the subject of a silent film.

Closure

The services were taken over by London Passenger Transport Board on 1 July 1933.

References

Tram transport in England
Walthamstow
1900s in Essex
1910s in Essex
1920s in Essex
1930s in Essex